Bernard Robert Blanchette  (July 11, 1947 – August 25, 2006) was a Canadian professional ice hockey player. During the 1972–73 season, Blanchette played 47 games in the World Hockey Association with the Chicago Cougars and Alberta Oilers, scoring 7 goals and 7 assists. After his retirement from professional hockey, he joined the RCMP.

Awards
 WCJHL Second All-Star Team – 1968

References

External links

1947 births
2006 deaths
Canadian ice hockey right wingers
Chicago Cougars players
Edmonton Oilers (WHA) players
Ice hockey people from Saskatchewan
Kansas City Blues players
Montreal Voyageurs players
Muskegon Mohawks players
Nova Scotia Voyageurs players
Royal Canadian Mounted Police officers
Sportspeople from North Battleford
Winston-Salem Polar Twins (SHL) players